The Portugal national under-19 football team represents Portugal in international football at this age level and is controlled by Federação Portuguesa de Futebol, the governing body for Portuguese football.

Competitive record

UEFA European Under-19 Championship

Recent results

Current squad
 The following players were called up for the UEFA Preparatory Tournament matches.
 Match dates: 23, 26 and 29 November 2022
 Opposition: ,  and 
Caps and goals correct as of: 26 September 2022, after the match against .

References

External links

Portugal U19 Soccerway Profile

European national under-19 association football teams
F